Robert (Robbie) Kostadinovich (born 7 September 1973) is a Swiss male handball player. He was a member of the Switzerland men's national handball team. He was part of the  team at the 1996 Summer Olympics, playing five matches. On club level he played for TV Suhr and ZMC Amicitia.

References

1973 births
Living people
Swiss male handball players
Handball players at the 1996 Summer Olympics
Olympic handball players of Switzerland